The 2015 season was Barcelona Sporting Club's the 90th year in existence and the club's 57th in the top flight of Ecuadorian football. Barcelona was one of the twelve participating clubs in the top flight of Ecuadorian Football Championship 2015. Besides the local tournament, Barcelona took part in the 2015 edition of the Copa Libertadores.

The club reaffirmed as technical director of team staff to the Uruguayan Ruben Israel, extending his contract until the middle of 2015. However, the poor results that the club had in the first half of the season led to the directive to not renew his contract. Israel's last game as coach of the club was on May 28 in a friendly match against RCD Espanyol in an exhibition tournament called 2015 Copa EuroAmericana, which won the Barcelona. Then, the club hired the Uruguayan Guillermo Almada, who was in charge of technical leadership until the end of the season.

Barcelona joined the group 7 of the Copa Libertadores, in which-after one win, one draw and four defeats did not qualify to the second round, being eliminated from the tournament.

In the first stage of the Serie A, Barcelona was ranked in fourth place, and in the second stage in sixth place; after which he could not access the two spots that led to the finals of the local tournament. In total, Barcelona reached fourth place in the accumulated table, reaching only qualifying for the 2016 Copa Sudamericana with the quota of Ecuador 2.

Pre-season and friendlies

Competitions

Overall

Serie A

First stage

Stage table

Results summary

Results by round

Matches

Second stage

Stage table

Results summary

Results by round

Matches

Aggregate table

Copa Libertadores

Group stage

References

Barcelona S.C. seasons
Barcelona